Aconodes multituberculatus is a species of beetle in the family Cerambycidae. It was described by Stephan von Breuning in 1947. It is known from Bhutan.

References

Aconodes
Beetles described in 1947